Přístav is a Czech television programme which was first broadcast in 2015. In Czech přístav means 'port'. The programme was written by various writers and directed by Jana Rezková (2015–2017), Jaromír Polisenský (2015–2016) and Ján Novák (2015–2016). The series was nominated as Best Television Drama at the 2015 Czech Lion Awards. Actress Vanda Hybnerová's father, Boris Hybner, appeared alongside her in one of the episodes.

Cast
Filip Blažek
Pavel Řezníček
Vanda Hybnerová
Petr Čtvrtníček
Kateřina Hrachovcová-Hercíková
Martin Zounar
Kristýna Kociánová
Martin Dejdar
Jitka Schneiderová
Sandra Černodrinská
Václav Jiráček
Markéta Žroutová
Norbert Lichý
Bohumil Klepl
Hana Gregorová
Ladislav Potměšil
Olga Želenská
Zuzana Slavíková
Petr Lexa
Natálie Grossová
Jan Szymik
Adam Drábek
Petr Klimeš

References

External links 
 CSFD.cz - Přístav
 

Czech comedy television series
2015 Czech television series debuts
Czech drama television series
Prima televize original programming
Czech romantic television series